Viktar Hanchar, or Viktar Hančar (Viktor Gonchar, September 7, 1957 – September 16, 1999?) was a Belarusian politician who disappeared and was presumably murdered in 1999. He was born in the village of Radzichava, Slutsk Raion.

Hanchar graduated from the Law Department of the Belarusian State University in 1979 and worked as law research worker at different major Belarusian institutions.

Political career
Beginning in May 1991, Hanchar worked as first deputy chairman of Maladzyechna mayor. In May 1994, he ran for the Constitutional Court of Belarus, but did not receive the support of most MPs.

During the presidential elections in 1994, Hanchar was one of the most active in the election campaign headquarters of Alexander Lukashenko. In 1994, after the victory of Lukashenko in the presidential elections, Hanchar was appointed Deputy Prime Minister of Belarus, but soon resigned. Hanchar joined the opposition to the president and joined the United Civic Party, becoming a member of its Political Council (since 1995). In 1995-1996 he was general secretary of the CIS Economic Court.

In 1995, Hanchar was elected to the Supreme Soviet of Belarus. In 1996 he was appointed chairman of the Central Election Committee (CEC), and actively opposed to Lukashenko during the 1996 referendum. In 1996, he was dismissed by the president from his position. Hanchar never recognized the results of the 1996 referendum as legitimate. In 1998, Hanchar led an alternative Election Committee during the 1999 presidential election, organized by the opposition as a protest against constitutional reforms by Lukashenko.

Disappearance 
Hanchar disappeared in Minsk on September 16, 1999, along with his friend, the businessman Anatol Krasouski. Pieces of broken glass and blood were found on the supposed site where Hanchar and Krasouski had been last seen. On December 5, 2002, they were officially declared missing by the court. In January 2003, the Chief Prosecutor of Minsk suspended the criminal investigation into the disappearance of Hanchar and Krasouski.

According to the former head of jail number 1 Oleg Alkaev (Aleh Alkaeu), Viktar Hanchar was abducted and executed on the order of people close to President Lukashenko. Investigation of the disappearance of Hanchar and Krasouski is one of the main issues of the Belarusian opposition, and is also mentioned in the documents of international organizations.

In September 2004, the European Union and the United States issued travel bans for five Belarusian officials suspected of being involved in the kidnapping of Hanchar:  Interior Affairs Minister Vladimir Naumov, Prosecutor General Viktor Sheiman, Minister for Sports and Tourism Yuri Sivakov, and Colonel Dmitry Pavlichenko [who is the fifth?] from the Belarus Interior Ministry.

For several years the Belarusian opposition has organized the Day of Solidarity with Belarus on the 16th of every month to commemorate the disappearance of Hanchar, Krasouski, Jury Zacharanka, Dzmitry Zavadski, and the mysterious death of Hienadz Karpienka.

In December 2019, Deutsche Welle published a documentary film in which Yury Harauski, a former member of a special unit of the Belarusian Ministry of Interior, confirmed that it was his unit that had arrested, taken away and murdered Yury Zakharanka, and that they later did the same with Viktar Hanchar and Anatol Krasouski.

See also
 List of people who disappeared

References

External links
Kidnapping of Hanchar and Krasouski: authorities have something to hide
Viktar Hanchar on ciwr.org

1957 births
1990s missing person cases
Belarusian jurists
Belarusian State University alumni
Members of the Supreme Council of Belarus
Missing people
Missing person cases in Belarus
People from Slutsk District
United Civic Party of Belarus politicians